Jekyll and Hyde is an  adventure video game by Cryo Interactive. It was released for Microsoft Windows in 2001. The game is based on the 1886 novella Strange Case of Dr Jekyll and Mr Hyde by Robert Louis Stevenson. A PlayStation 2 version was planned but was eventually cancelled.

Gameplay 

Set in 1890 London, this game puts the player in the role of Dr. Jekyll, whose mission is to save his daughter, Laurie, from her kidnappers by recovering certain mysterious and magical artifacts in one night. Dr. Jekyll has no choice but to reactivate his laboratory equipment and bring back his dreaded alter ego, Mr. Hyde.

Reception 

Although the sound effects are praised, Jekyll & Hyde didn't receive many positive reviews from critics. IGN says "Good voice acting is unfortunately overshadowed by the lack of animation when characters are speaking...if almost nothing else is good about a game, sound cannot save it." GameSpot criticized the game's confusing camera angles and bad control, saying "it seems less like a game and more like a parody of the action-adventure genre."

See also 
 List of video games by Cryo Interactive
 Adaptations of Strange Case of Dr. Jekyll and Mr. Hyde

References 

2001 video games
DreamCatcher Interactive games
Fiction set in 1890
Video games set in the 1890s
Video games set in London
Adventure games
Cryo Interactive games
Video games developed in France
Windows games
Windows-only games
Video games about mental health
Video games about shapeshifting
Video games based on Strange Case of Dr Jekyll and Mr Hyde